This is a list of airports in Nebraska (a U.S. state), grouped by type and sorted by location. It contains all public-use and military airports in the state. Some private-use and former airports may be included where notable, such as airports that were previously public-use, those with commercial enplanements recorded by the FAA or airports assigned an IATA airport code.

Airports

See also 
 Essential Air Service
 Nebraska World War II Army Airfields
 Wikipedia:WikiProject Aviation/Airline destination lists: North America#Nebraska

References 

Federal Aviation Administration (FAA):
 FAA Airport Data (Form 5010) from National Flight Data Center (NFDC), also available from AirportIQ 5010
 National Plan of Integrated Airport Systems (2017–2021), released 4 October 2016
 Passenger Boarding (Enplanement) Data for CY 2016 (final), released October 2017
Nebraska Department of Aeronautics:
 Nebraska Department of Aeronautics
 Public Use Airports in Nebraska

Other sites used as a reference when compiling and updating this list:
 Aviation Safety Network – used to check IATA airport codes
 Great Circle Mapper: Airports in Nebraska – used to check IATA and ICAO airport codes
 Abandoned & Little-Known Airfields: Nebraska – used for information on former airports

 
Nebraska
Airports
Airports